Antonio Paticchi (Rome, February, 1762- February, 1788) was an Italian painter, active in Rome, painting pastel portraits.

Biography
He trained with his father, and was noted for his many designs, many derived from Polidoro da Caravaggio. He painted for the refectory of the Carmelites in Velletri. He painted the gallery in the Palace of Count Torrazzi, depicting the Carriage of the Night. He also painted two canvases depicting the Loves of Jove. He also painted a Murder of the Family of Niobe, but died from a heart ailment.

References

1762 births
1788 deaths
18th-century Italian painters
Italian male painters
Italian neoclassical painters
Pastel artists
18th-century Italian male artists